9th ADG Awards
February 12, 2005

Contemporary Film: 
 The Terminal 

Period or Fantasy Film: 
 Lemony Snicket's A Series of Unfortunate Events 

The 9th Art Directors Guild Awards, given on 12 February 2005, honored the best art directors of 2004.

Winners and nominees

Film
 Contemporary Film:
 Alex McDowell – The Terminal
David Wasco – Collateral
Dan Leigh – Eternal Sunshine of the Spotless Mind
Mark Friedberg – The Life Aquatic
Henry Bumstead – Million Dollar Baby

 Fantasy or Period Film:
 Rick Heinrichs – Lemony Snicket's A Series of Unfortunate Events
Dante Ferretti – The Aviator
Gemma Jackson – Finding Neverland
Lou Romano – The Incredibles
Anthony Pratt – The Phantom of the Opera

References

External links 

 ADG Awards: Winners & nominees (2005)

Art Directors Guild Awards
2004 film awards
2004 guild awards
2005 in American cinema